Margaret Elizabeth Tebbit, Lady Tebbit (24 May 1934 – 19 December 2020) was an English nurse who was paralysed from the chest down by the Provisional IRA's 12 October 1984 bombing of the Grand Brighton Hotel, where she was staying with her husband, Norman Tebbit (then Secretary of State for Trade and Industry), during the Conservative Party Conference.

Early life
Margaret Daines was born in Ely, Cambridgeshire, to Stan Daines, a tenant farmer, and his wife Elsie; she had eight siblings. After leaving school at 16, she became a nurse. In 1955, she met Norman Tebbit at Westminster Hospital, London. They married at Westminster Congregational Chapel in 1956. They had two sons and a daughter. In 1965 and 1974, she was hospitalised with severe post-natal depression. She provided secretarial support to her husband's parliamentary work, and later worked as a nurse at St Bartholomew's Hospital, London.

Brighton hotel bombing (1984)
On 12 October 1984, Margaret and Norman Tebbit were among the 31 people who were injured in the Brighton hotel bombing; five people were also killed. Margaret Tebbit was more seriously injured than her husband; she had fallen through four floors and remained trapped for several hours. She spent two years in Stoke Mandeville Hospital and the Royal National Orthopaedic Hospital, undergoing treatment in their spinal injuries units. She recovered some use of her hands and arms but used a wheelchair for the rest of her life.

Later life
After heading the Conservatives' successful campaign in the 1987 general election, Norman Tebbit resigned from his ministerial role; he did not stand for re-election in 1992, being created a life peer as Baron Tebbit. He had earlier promised that, to support Margaret Tebbit's continued care, he would leave Parliament and augment the family's income by working in business. In his 1988 autobiography, he discusses his respect for his wife's strength of character.

Lady Tebbit was vice-president of the spinal-cord injury charity Aspire. She appeared on the BBC Radio programme Desert Island Discs on 31 December 1995; she compared her experiences of severe post-natal depression with her later physical disability.

Lady Tebbit died at home in Bury St Edmunds, Suffolk, on 19 December 2020 at the age of 86, having had dementia with Lewy bodies.

References

Further reading

External links

1934 births
2020 deaths
British baronesses
English nurses
Spouses of life peers
Survivors of terrorist attacks
People with paraplegia
Deaths from dementia in England
Deaths from Lewy body dementia